Ken Flach and Robert Seguso were the defending champions, but lost in the final to Anders Järryd and Mats Wilander. The score was 4–6, 6–3, 6–2.

Seeds

Draw

Finals

Top half

Bottom half

References

External links
 Official results archive (ATP)
 Official results archive (ITF)

Italian Open - Mens Doubles
1985 Italian Open (tennis)